Croatia competed at the 2019 Winter Deaflympics held between 12 and 21 December 2019 in Province of Sondrio in Northern Italy. The country won three bronze medals and the country finished in 15th place in the medal table.

Medalists

Alpine skiing 

Rea Hraski won the bronze medal in both the women's downhill and women's Super-G events.

Chess 

The men's team won the bronze medal in the men's tournament.

Curling 

Croatia lost their bronze medal match against South Korea in the women's curling tournament.

References 

Winter Deaflympics
Nations at the 2019 Winter Deaflympics